PJC may refer to:

 Pacific Jewish Center The last synagogue in Venice, CA
 Police and Judicial Co-operation in Criminal Matters, a pillar of the European Union
 Pensacola Junior College, in Florida, USA
 Pioneer Junior College, in Singapore
 Paris Junior College, in Paris, Texas
 Pedro Juan Caballero Airport, IATA code PJC
 Prayer for Judgement Continued, a legal plea used in certain U.S. states
 Premature junctional contraction (medicine), a premature beat originating at the AV node of the heart.
 Princeton Junction station, New Jersey, Amtrak station code PJC